Bagger 1473 is a bucket-wheel excavator left abandoned in a field in the municipality of Schipkau in Germany.

History 
The excavator was used at the Tagebau Meuro mine from 1965 to 2002.

After it was withdrawn from service, the municipalities Senftenberg, Großräschen, and Schipkau decided on a joint action to preserve the opencast mining machine. The machine was moved across industrial roads and railways owned by the LMBV but public traffic was not affected.

When Bagger 1473 became popular with the urban explorers, it was misidentified as Bagger 258 because of markings found on its information plate.

Scrapping 
In January 2019 the municipalities that supported its move announced that the excavator was to be scrapped. Their decision was mainly due to the machine's dilapidation and damage. It was financially impossible to maintain and because vandalism and theft had become so extensive, the structure was no longer safe for people. Parts of the excavator would be preserved, such as its wheel.

However, when the Brandenburg Landesamt für Denkmalpflege (State Office for the Preservation of Monuments) and state archaeological museum learned of the planned demolition from news reports, they issued a statement the excavator had acknowledged historical structure protection since 2002/2003. Although at that time, it was simply assumed that it was unnecessary to formally place it on the list of such structures. The fact that the structure was identified as historically significant was considered sufficient to declare it as protected. The Landesamt quickly made it official in February.

Constructive discussions about the future of Bagger 1473 are ongoing with the local municipalities and communities. Despite imminent demolition work being prevented, it remains unclear how the structure can be preserved and who will have financial responsibility.

See also
 Overburden Conveyor Bridge F60
 EuroSpeedway Lausitz

References

External links 

 Tagebau Meuro at ostkohle.de
 "Tagebau Meuro: 1958–1999" (in German)

Engineering vehicles
Bucket-wheel excavators
Mining in Germany
Takraf GmbH